J.K. Raymond-Millet (12 September 1902 – 15 August 1974) was a French film director and journalist.

Biography
J.K. Raymond-Millet was a documentary filmmaker and the creator of Les Films J.K. Raymond-Millet. On 29 September 1923, he married Marcelle Robert, alias Monique Muntcho in Paris. Together with Robert, he produced various films under different film production banners: Les Films de la Colombe, Les Films J.K.Raymond-Millet. He also authored poetry and travelogues.

He produced several documentaries in the Interwar period, notably Aude, belle inconnue under the Vichy regime, and continued his career after the Second World War.

In 1947, he produced and directed Télévision, oeil de demain which predicted smartphones and video calling.
The film was based on a premise from the science fiction author René Barjavel.

Filmography
 1925 : Géants d'acier, pieuvres mécaniques
 1926 : L'Industrie vinicole en Oranie
 1929 : Promenade en Afrique équatoriale française
 1930 : France-Congo sur un cargo
 1932 : À la rencontre du soleil
 1934 : Le Manioc
 1935 : La Chanson du Manioc
 1935 : L'Ile de la Réunion
 1936 : Concert Caraïbe
 1937 : Au pays du vrai rhum
 1937 : Aude, belle inconnue
 1937 : Occitanie
 1939 : L'Albigeois
 1940 : La Haute-Vallée de la Garonne
 1940 : Terres vermeilles
 1943 : L'Ariège, rivière de France
 1943 : Gens et coutumes d'Armagnac
 1944 : Au Pays du Magnan
 1944 : Le Chemin de Madagascar
 1944 : Terres créoles
 1944 : Voyage mauve
 1945 : L'Ennemi secret
 1945 : Les Heures passent
 1945 : Naissance d'un spectacle
 1945 : La Vallée du Têt
 1947 : Divertissement espagnol
 1947 : La Télévision, œil de demain
 1948 : Il était une montagne
 1948 : La Source du sourire
 1949 : Minarets dans le soleil
 1949 : Sedan
 1951 : Cheveux noirs, capes grises
 1951 : La Grande île au coeur des Saintes-Eaux
 1951 : Réalités malgaches
 1951 : Terre du sucre et du rhum
 1952 : Pêcheurs et pescadous
 1952 : Sud
 1953 : Nommé à Majunga
 1953 : Plein ciel malgache
 1953 : Tamatave la Marine
 1954 : Modern Magascar
 1958 : Vertiges
 1958 : Un Village d'Algérie
 1960 : La Démographie Algérienne
 1960 : L'Economie Algérienne
 1964 : La Jeunesse de Monsieur Pasteur
 1967 : Chronique du païs du Tarn
 1972 : Paris d'une fenêtre

References

Further reading

External links
 
 La Télévision, œil de demain (1947, extract) (YouTube) - film presciently showing smartphone-like behaviors

French film directors
1902 births
1974 deaths